Advanced Sports International (ASI) is an American bicycle company whose flagship brand is Fuji Bikes. It also owns smaller brands including triathlon-focused Kestrel USA, component maker Oval Concepts, Breezer bikes, Tuesday Cycles and BMX maker SE Bikes. ASI is headquartered in Philadelphia and was led by Patrick Cunnane until filing for bankruptcy.

History
The company was established in 1998. The company has generally followed a strategy of buying struggling brands and returning them to profitability. ASI purchased Fuji Bikes in 1998 after Fuji's sales had declined due to missing the mountain biking boom. It soon repositioned the brand from a mass-market brand sold mainly in sporting goods stores to a higher-end brand sold by more independent bicycle dealers.

It bought Breezer Bikes in 2008, Oval Concepts in 2009, and Phat Cycles in 2015. In August 2016, it purchased the bicycle retailer Performance Bicycle.

In 2007, the company's total revenue was $50 million, with about 5% market share among bikes sold by independent dealers. By 2015, that had grown to $105 million.

It is associated with the Taiwanese bicycle manufacturer Ideal Bike Corp.

Advanced Sports International filed for Chapter 11 bankruptcy on November 16, 2018.  All Performance Bike stores are closing.

On February 1, 2019, the Tiger Group won ASI at auction.

References

External links
 

Bicycle framebuilders
Companies based in Philadelphia
Privately held companies of the United States
Cycle manufacturers of the United States
Companies that filed for Chapter 11 bankruptcy in 2018